Various forms of witchcraft and divination are mentioned in the Hebrew Bible (Tanakh or Old Testament), generally (but not always) in a disapproving tone.

Prohibitions
Laws prohibiting various forms of witchcraft and divination can be found in the books of Exodus, Leviticus and Deuteronomy. These include the following (as translated in the King James Version):

Exodus 22:18 – Thou shalt not suffer a witch to live.
Leviticus 19:26 – Ye shall not ... use enchantment, nor observe times.
Leviticus 20:27 – A man also or woman that hath a familiar spirit, or that is a wizard, shall surely be put to death: they shall stone them with stones: their blood shall be upon them.
Deuteronomy 18:10-11 – There shall not be found among you any ... that useth divination, or an observer of times, or an enchanter, or a witch, or a charmer, or a consulter with familiar spirits, or a wizard, or a necromancer.

The forms of divination mentioned in Deuteronomy 18 are portrayed as being of foreign origin. This is the only part of the Hebrew Bible to make such a claim. According to Ann Jeffers, the presence of laws forbidding necromancy proves that it was practiced throughout Israel's history.

The exact difference between the three forbidden forms of necromancy mentioned in Deuteronomy 18:11 is a matter of uncertainty; yidde'oni ("wizard") is always used together with ob ("consulter with familiar spirits"), and its semantic similarity to doresh el ha-metim ("necromancer", or "one who directs inquiries to the dead") raises the question of why all three are mentioned in the same verse. The Jewish tractate Sanhedrin makes the distinction that a doresh el ha-metim was a person who would sleep in a cemetery after having starved himself, in order to become possessed.

A prophetic passage in the Book of Micah states that witchcraft and soothsaying will be eliminated in the Messianic Age (Micah 5:12).

Instances in Biblical narrative
 The Levites made use of the Urim and Thummim and various forms of sacrifice as instruments of divination to determine guilt and innocence in law cases (see, for instance, Deuteronomy 33:8-10).
 The silver chalice that is placed in Benjamin's sack when he leaves Egypt is described as being used by Joseph for divination, which is often taken as a reference to its use for scrying.
 Numbers 5:11-31 describes a practice of making a wife who has been accused of adultery drink a mixture of water and dust from the floor of the Tabernacle in order to prove her guilt or innocence.
 In 1 Samuel 28, Saul enlists the Witch of Endor to summon the spirit of the deceased prophet Samuel.

See also
 Christian views on magic
 Daemonologie
 Halakha
 Islam and magic
 Jewish views on astrology
 Mediumship
 Practical Kabbalah
 Semitic neopaganism

References

Further reading

Divination
Hebrew Bible topics
Judaism and paganism
Judaism and witchcraft